The Globen Galan is an annual indoor athletics event held in February at the Ericsson Globe in Stockholm, Sweden. The meeting was first held in 1990 and from 2000 to 2010 known as GE Galan, because General Electric was the official title sponsor. From 2011 to 2015 the official name changed to XL Galan and was sponsored by Swedish book-trade company XL-BYGG. 

The 2016 edition was part of the inaugural IAAF World Indoor Tour, but after a loss of sponsorship, was not held in 2017.

Meseret Defar made a world record run in the 5000 metres at the 2009 edition. She returned for a second record attempt in 2010 and finished just hundredths of a second short of the record, although Alemitu Bekele's second-place finish improved the European record indoors.

World records

Over the course of its history, numerous world records have been set at the GE Galan.

Meeting records

Men

Women

References

External links
 Official website
 XL Galan Records

IAAF Indoor Permit Meetings
Athletics competitions in Sweden
Sport in Stockholm
Athletics
Recurring sporting events established in 1990
Winter events in Sweden
World Athletics Indoor Tour